Red Deer Lake is a fresh water alkaline lake situated near Bashaw in central Alberta, Canada.

In descending order of surface area, it straddles the boundaries of Ponoka County, Camrose County and the County of Wetaskiwin No. 10. The lake is drained through a series of marshes into the Battle River.

The lake has been steadily dropping since 1974 when it was 771.5 m to the 2018 level of 768.6 m, on average 7 cm per year. The cause of the drop is a mystery but losses to groundwater is suspected.

See also
Lakes in Alberta

References

Camrose County
Lakes of Alberta
Ponoka County
County of Wetaskiwin No. 10